Thomas Marriott James (May 18, 1875 – July 8, 1942) was an American architect, active in the Boston area, best known for his bank buildings in styles ranging from Neoclassical to Spanish Renaissance to Art Deco.

James was born in Cambridge, Massachusetts to Joseph K. and Elizabeth Troy James, and married on June 9, 1897, in Everett, to Ruth Lyra Dodge. He trained under Samuel J. Brown, in 1898 he began practice, and in 1920 incorporated as the Thomas M. James Company. His designs include his parents' house in Somerville, 1894; Oren Sanborn House, Winchester 1906–1907, in partnership with Clinton M. Hill from 1905 to 1908; Boston's Shubert Theatre, Boston 1910; the United Electric Co. Building, Springfield 1910; Eliot Five Cents Savings Bank, Roxbury 1916; the Rockland Trust Company building, 1917; Warren Institution for Savings Building, Boston 1920; National Bank at Springfield, 1920; State Street Trust Building at 75 Federal Street, 1929; the East Cambridge Savings Bank, 1931; and the Arlington Co-operative Bank, 1935. Other works include the Chatham Phenix National Bank and Trust Company, New York, and the Commonwealth Atlantic National Bank Building in Post Office Square, Boston.

References 
 Back Bay Houses article
 "Charlie Allen Renovations receives Contractor of the Year Award"
 "Hill & James - Beaux Arts Splendor in a Suburban Setting", by Roger G. Reed

American architects
1875 births
1942 deaths
People from Cambridge, Massachusetts